"Sweet Ermengarde" is a short comic story by American horror fiction writer H. P. Lovecraft under the pseudonym "Percy Simple". As a comedy it is a curiosity of his early writing, and was probably written between 1919 and 1921; Lovecraft scholars state it is "the only work of fiction by HPL that cannot be dated with precision." It was first published in the Arkham House collection Beyond the Wall of Sleep (1943).

Synopsis
The story is a parody of romantic melodrama, centering on Ethyl Ermengarde Stubbs and her relationships with villainous mortgage-holder 'Squire Hardman, would-be rescuer Jack Manly and fiancé Algernon Reginald Jones. An H. P. Lovecraft Encyclopedia suggests that a more precise target for Lovecraft's satire was writer Fred Jackson, whose novels often "have exactly the sort of implausibility of plot and sentimentality of action that is parodied in 'Sweet Ermengarde'."

Reception
An H. P. Lovecraft Encyclopedia describes the story (with 'A Reminiscence of Dr. Samuel Johnson' and 'Ibid') as one of a trilogy of Lovecraft's "comic gems".

Notes

External links
 
 
 

Short stories by H. P. Lovecraft
1943 short stories